Essonodon is a mammal genus from the Upper Cretaceous of North America. It was a member of the extinct order Multituberculata and lived towards the end of the "age of the dinosaurs." It is within the suborder Cimolodonta and perhaps the family Cimolomyidae.

The genus Essonodon was named by Simpson G.G. in 1927, and is also partly known as Cimolodon. The inclusion of this taxon within Cimolomyidae is tentative. (Kielan-Jaworowska & Hurum 2001, p. 408).

The species: Essonodon browni has also partly been known as Cimolodon nitidus (Marsh 1889).

Place: Hell Creek, Montana & San Juan Basin, New Mexico & Wyoming (USA) 
Age: Maastrichtian (Upper Cretaceous)
This species was a large multituberculate that weighed in at over 2.5 kilograms. Further material has been reported from the Frenchman Formation of Canada.

References 
 Simpson (1927), "Mammalian fauna of the Hell Creek Formation of Montana." Amer. Mus. Novit. 267, p. 1-7, 6 figs.
 Kielan-Jaworowska Z & Hurum JH (2001), "Phylogeny and Systematics of multituberculate mammals." Paleontology 44, p. 389-429.
 Much of this information has been derived from  MESOZOIC MAMMALS; 'basal' Cimolodonta, Cimolomyidae, Boffiidae and Kogaionidae, an Internet directory.

Prehistoric mammal genera
Cretaceous mammals
Cimolodonts
Extinct mammals of North America
Hell Creek fauna
Ojo Alamo Formation